These are the Billboard Hot Dance/Disco Club Play and Maxi-Singles Sales number-one hits of 1998.

See also
1998 in music
List of number-one dance hits (United States)
List of artists who reached number one on the U.S. Dance chart

References

1998
1998 record charts
1998 in American music